The 1979 ICF Canoe Sprint World Championships were held in Duisburg, West Germany.

The men's competition consisted of six Canadian (single paddle, open boat) and nine kayak events. Three events were held for the women, all in kayak.

This was the fifteenth championships in canoe sprint. It was where an incident later referred to as The Česiunas Affair took place when Soviet-born Lithuanian canoer Vladas Česiūnas appeared at the event as a spectator only to vanish. The West German government claimed Česiunas had defected, but the former canoer had returned to the Soviet Union voluntarily several weeks later. During Česiunas' disappearance, he would speak in favor of the 1980 Summer Olympics boycott, more than two months before the Soviet–Afghan War, but later returned to the Soviet Embassy in Bonn. The Soviets toned down their rhetoric about Česiunas' "disappearance" in the West and changed his mind all the while West Germany continued to maintain that he had been kidnapped.

Medal summary

Men's

Canoe

Kayak

Women's

Kayak

Medals table

References
ICF medalists for Olympic and World Championships - Part 1: flatwater (now sprint): 1936-2007.
ICF medalists for Olympic and World Championships - Part 2: rest of flatwater (now sprint) and remaining canoeing disciplines: 1936-2007.
Wallechinsky, David and Jaime Loucky (2008). "Canoeing: Men's Canadian Pairs 1000 Meters". In The Complete Book of the Olympics: 2008 Edition. London: Aurum Press Limited. p. 493.

Icf Canoe Sprint World Championships, 1979
Icf Canoe Sprint World Championships, 1979
ICF Canoe
ICF Canoe Sprint World Championships
Canoe
Canoeing and kayaking competitions in Germany